Jeanne Dielman, 23 quai du Commerce, 1080 Bruxelles ("Jeanne Dielman, 23 Commerce Quay, 1080 Brussels") is a 1975 film written and directed by Belgian filmmaker Chantal Akerman. It was filmed over five weeks on location in Brussels, and financed through a $120,000 grant awarded by the Belgian government. Distinguished by its restrained pace, long takes, and static camerawork, the film is a slice of life depiction of a widowed housewife (portrayed by Delphine Seyrig) over the course of three days.

The film was met with mixed critical reception upon its release, but gained exposure in Europe and later became a cult classic. It has been labeled an exemplar of the slow cinema genre, as well as of feminist film. In a critics' poll conducted by The Village Voice in 2000, it was named the 19th greatest film of the twentieth century. In a critics' poll published by Sight & Sound in 2022, it was named the greatest film of all time.

Plot
The film examines a widowed mother's regimented schedule of cooking, cleaning, mothering, and running errands over three days. The woman (whose name, Jeanne Dielman, is only discerned from the title and a letter she reads to her son), earns money by having sex with a different client each afternoon before her son arrives home from school. Like her other activities, Jeanne's sex work is part of a mundane routine she performs daily by rote. 

After a visit by a client on the second day, Jeanne's orderly behavior begins to subtly unravel. She overcooks potatoes while preparing dinner, then wanders around the apartment carrying the potato pot. She forgets to cover the porcelain in which she keeps her money, forgets to turn off lights in the rooms she leaves, misses a button on her house coat, and drops a newly washed spoon. The alterations to Jeanne's routine continue until her client arrives on the third day. During sex she either has an orgasm or is disgusted by what she is doing, then dresses herself and stabs him to death with a pair of scissors. She then sits quietly at her dining room table.

Cast
 Delphine Seyrig as Jeanne Dielman
  as Sylvain Dielman
 Henri Storck as the first client
 Jacques Doniol-Valcroze as the second client
 Yves Bical as the third client
 Chantal Akerman as the voice of a neighbor in the hallway

Production
After establishing herself as a major film director in 1974 with Je, tu, il, elle, Akerman said that she "felt ready to make a feature with more money" and applied for a grant from the Belgian government for financial support, submitting a script that Jane Clarke described as portraying "a rigorous regimen [constructed] around food ... and routine bought sex in the afternoon". This script would only be the rough basis for Jeanne Dielman, 23 quai du Commerce, 1080 Bruxelles because after Akerman received the government grant of $120,000 and began production, she threw the script out and began a new film instead. Akerman also explained that she was able to make a female-centric film because "at that point everybody was talking about women" and that it was "the right time".

Shooting Jeanne Dielman, 23 quai du Commerce, 1080 Bruxelles took five weeks and Akerman called it "a love film for my mother. It gives recognition to that kind of woman". Akerman used an all female crew for the film, which she later said "didn't work that well - not because they were women but because I didn't choose them. It was enough just to be a woman to work on my film ... so the shooting was awful". Akerman further stated that the film is a reaction to "a hierarchy of images" in cinema that places a car accident or a kiss "higher in the hierarchy than washing up ... And it's not by accident, but relates to the place of woman in the social hierarchy ... Woman's work comes out of oppression and whatever comes out of oppression is more interesting. You have to be definite. You have to be".

The film depicts long moments of the life of Jeanne Dielman in real time, which Akerman said "was the only way to shoot the film - to avoid cutting the action in a hundred places, to look carefully and to be respectful. The framing was meant to respect her space, her, and her gestures within it". The long static shots ensure that the viewer "always knows where I am."

Reception

Initial release
Jeanne Dielman, 23 quai du Commerce, 1080 Bruxelles premiered in the Directors' Fortnight of the 1975 Cannes Film Festival. It initially met with mixed critical reception; many criticized it as a boring or meaningless exercise in minimalism, while others praised its visuals and use of time. The film's exposure and financial success in Europe helped Akerman to obtain funding for her 1978 film Les Rendez-vous d'Anna. Jeanne Dielman was not released in the United States until 1983.

Upon its release, critic Louis Marcorelles called it the "first masterpiece of the feminine in the history of the cinema". Jonathan Rosenbaum defended the film's length and pace, saying that it "needs its running time, for its subject is an epic one, and the overall sweep ... trains one to recognize and respond to fluctuations and nuances. If a radical cinema is something that goes to the roots of experience, this is at the very least a film that shows where and how some of these roots are buried". Critic Gary Indiana said that "Akerman's brilliance is her ability to keep the viewer fascinated by everything normally left out of movies". B. Ruby Rich said that "never before was the materiality of woman's time in the home rendered so viscerally ... She invents a new language capable of transmitting truths previously unspoken". Marsha Kinder called it "the best feature that I have ever seen made by a woman". Akerman was reluctant to be seen as a feminist filmmaker, stating that "I don't think woman's cinema exists".

Modern reception
The film has been characterized as an exemplar of the slow cinema genre, in which time is foregrounded and narrative action is downplayed. Critic Richard Brody called it a "tour de force of cinematic modernism [that] puts time onscreen as it was never seen before". Critic Jessica Winter wrote that "the film's strength derives in significant part from its austerity, patience, and extreme discipline", calling attention to its use of fixed shots, long takes, and absence of closeups or reaction shots. Winter asserted that "as the minutes and hours pass, Akerman rewards the viewer's attention by recalibrating it".  In a 2009 essay, Ivone Marguilies observed that the film was "fully in tune" with the European women's movement of the time, and that feminist critics welcomed its "rigorous alignment of sexual/gender politics with a formal economy—showing cooking and hiding sex—... as an impressive alternative to well-intentioned but conventional political documentaries and features".

Jeanne Dielman, 23 quai du Commerce, 1080 Bruxelles has garnered a cult following and praise from the film community. Filmmakers Todd Haynes, Gus Van Sant, and Céline Sciamma have drawn explicit influence from the film; Van Sant named it an inspiration for his own similar films Gerry (2002) and Elephant (2003). The film has also been subject to spoofs and parodic versions. With the release of the DVD edition by The Criterion Collection in 2009, the company held a contest that invited fans to create cooking videos inspired by the film, and to post them on YouTube.

Accolades
The film was named the 19th greatest film of the 20th century in a critics' poll conducted by The Village Voice in 2000. Rated 35th in the 2012 Sight & Sound "Greatest Films of All Time" critics' poll, and not rated in the top 100 of the 2012 directors' list, in 2022, the film was given the distinction of being voted as Sight & Sounds "greatest film of all time". The film ranked number 1 on the critics' poll, and tied for 4th place in the directors' poll. It is the fourth film to top the critics' poll after Bicycle Thieves, Citizen Kane, and Vertigo, and the first directed by a woman to do so.

See also
 List of films considered the best

References

Notes

External links
 
 

1975 films
1975 drama films
1970s avant-garde and experimental films
1970s feminist films
1970s French films
1970s French-language films
1970s political drama films
Belgian avant-garde and experimental films
Belgian drama films
Cooking films
Films about families
Films about murderers
Films about prostitution in Belgium
Films about widowhood
Films directed by Chantal Akerman
Films set in Brussels
Films shot in Brussels
French avant-garde and experimental films
French feminist films
French political drama films
French-language Belgian films
Slice of life films